Kilvey Hill (Welsh: Mynydd Cilfái or Y Bigwrn) is a hill in South Wales, to the east of Swansea. The top of Kilvey Hill enjoys panoramic views of Swansea city centre, Swansea Docks, Swansea Bay, the Lower Swansea Valley, Bon-y-maen, Neath and Port Talbot. Cilfái was a commote of Gower. The historic name of the hill in Welsh is Y Bigwrn, with its summit known as Pen y Bigwrn. Currently, however, it is generally known in Welsh as Mynydd Cilfái, a translation of the English name.

There are a number of residential areas dotted around the base of the hill. To the north are Bon-y-maen and Pentrechwyth. To the south are Dan-y-graig, Port Tennant and St. Thomas.  At the top of the hill is the TV and radio transmitter station and a telecommunications mast.  The central belt of the hill consists of woodland and open grassland, which forms part of the Kilvey Community Woodland.  The hill is used to host a number of mountain biking events.

Access to the top of the hill by motor vehicles is only via a steep concrete road that leads up to the summit from the village of Bon-y-maen.

Kilvey Killer
The Kilvey Killer is an annual charity endurance race, usually held in August, which involves running up and down Kilvey Hill carrying a sack of cement. The race was established in 1989 by the former amateur boxing champion and trainer Nigel Page to raise money for a special baby unit for Singleton Hospital, Swansea, which had saved his daughter Kirsty's life after she was born prematurely.

References

External links
BBC South West Wales – Kilvey Community Woodland

Mountains and hills of Swansea
Mountain running competitions